Mira-Bhayandar is a city and municipal corporation in Thane district in the state of Maharashtra, India located in the northern part of Salsette Island before the Vasai Creek, and shares a border with North Mumbai. Mira-Bhayandar is administered by Mira-Bhayandar Municipal Corporation (MBMC), with a population at the 2011 Census of 809,378. Mira-Bhayandar is a part of Mumbai Metropolitan Region (MMR).

History
The Mira-Bhayandar Municipal Council was formed on 12 June 1985 by incorporating all the village Gram Panchayats. Consequently, MBMC obtained an administrative officer and a chief officer to look after the affairs of the area after the term of the elected representatives ceased and elections were delayed owing to the COVID-19 pandemic.

MBMC is currently run by an administrator appointed by the State Government of Maharashtra.

Demographics

The 2011 India census recorded a population of 809,378 in Mira-Bhayandar. According to the Indian Census data, the majority of the population are Hindus followed by Muslims and Christians. 

Economic growth is led by the manufacturing sector. Bhayandar is divided into two parts by the Mumbai suburban rail line - East and West. Mira Road has seen development only in the East part, while the West part, on the other side of the railway line is covered with salt pans and mangroves. Mira Road East is a predominantly residential area. Its calm, quiet surroundings and low pollution make it a desirable residential oasis.

Bhayandar West was traditionally residential, and the East predominantly an industrial area in the field of steel utensils manufacturing. Recent population growth and a flurry of construction has blurred the boundaries between Bhayandar and neighboring Mira Road on the East side of the rail tracks, turning it into a populous suburb. Government-owned Salt Pans and marshland in West Mira Road have restricted the southward spread of Bhayandar. There is a lot of scope for development of this land as it has the potential to house a large industrial complex.

Mira-Bhayandar, it is also shown in the linguistic demography of the suburb, while the official language Marathi is spoken by the natives of the land and migrants from other parts of Maharashtra.

References

External links
Ancient History of Thane
Mira-Bhayandar Municipal Corporation official site.

 
Cities in Maharashtra